Gun Law is a 1938 film. It made a profit of $47,000.

Plot
After he finds the wanted outlaw "The Raven" dead from having sipped water from a contaminated stream, U.S. Marshal Tom O'Malley decides to impersonate him and investigate criminal activities in the Arizona town of Gunsight.

Saloon keeper Flash Arnold and a corrupt mayor are engaged in various nefarious deeds. At first they believe O'Malley to be the Raven and even appoint him the town's sheriff. Then they try to frame him after the lawman begins foiling their robbery attempts, but O'Malley prevails.

Cast
 George O'Brien as Tom O'Malley
 Ward Bond as Pecos
 Robert Gleckler as Flash Arnold
 Rita Oehmen as Ruth Ross
 Ray Whitley as Singing Sam McGee
 Paul Everton as John Blaine
 Francis McDonald as Henchman Nevada
 Edward Pawley as The Raven

References

External links
 
 
 
 

1938 crime films
1938 films
American black-and-white films
Films produced by Bert Gilroy
RKO Pictures films
American crime films
Films directed by David Howard
1930s American films